Nigeria participated in the 2010 Summer Youth Olympics in Singapore.

Medalists

Athletics

Boys
Track and Road Events

Field Events

Girls
Track and Road Events

Field Events

Badminton

Girls

Boxing

Boys

Table tennis

Individual

Team

Weightlifting

Wrestling

Freestyle

References

External links
Competitors List: Nigeria

2010 in Nigerian sport
Nations at the 2010 Summer Youth Olympics
Nigeria at the Youth Olympics